"Jackpot" is a Japanese-language song, and the eighth Japanese single, by South Korean boy band  Boyfriend from their eighth Japanese single album of the same name. This was their second single released under Kiss Entertainment in the Japanese market. The single was released physically, in four different versions, on November 2, 2016.

Track listing

Music videos

Release history

References 

Boyfriend (band) songs
2016 songs
2016 singles
Japanese-language songs
Starship Entertainment singles